Boys Life 2 is a compilation of four short films about being gay in America, released in 1997.

Must Be the Music (directed by Nickolas Perry) offers a frank depiction of urban gay youth.
Nunzio's Second Cousin (directed by Tom DeCerchio) finds a gay policeman getting even with homophobic people.
Alkali, Iowa (directed by Mark Christopher) chronicles a Midwestern, teenaged gay male who unearths his dead father's secret.
The Dadshuttle (directed by Tom Donaghy) centers on the communication breakdown between a father and his son, who is gay.

A limited edition DVD also included a fifth segment, Trevor, starring Brett Barsky.

Partial cast
 Must Be the Music
 Milo Ventimiglia Nunzio's Second Cousin Vincent D'Onofrio
 Eileen Brennan
 Seth Green
 Alcali, Iowa J. D. Cerna
 Mary Beth HurtThe Dadshuttle Matt McGrath
 Peter Maloney

See also
 List of American films of 1997
 Boys Life Boys Life 3 Boys Life 4: Four Play''

References

External links
 
 

1997 drama films
1997 films
American LGBT-related films
Boys Life films
American anthology films
1997 LGBT-related films
1990s English-language films
Films directed by Nickolas Perry
1990s American films